Galambos is a Hungarian surname.  Meaning a keeper of doves, from galamb ‘dove’, ‘pigeon’ 

Notable people with the surname include:

 Andrew Joseph Galambos (1924–1997), Hungarian-born American astrophysicist, philosopher, and economist
 Eva Galambos (born c. 1928), the first mayor of Sandy Springs, Georgia
 George M. Galambos, Hungarian-born computer engineer
 Imre Galambos (born 1967), Hungarian sinologist and tangutologist
 Janos Galambos (born 1940), Hungarian mathematician
 Robert Galambos (1914–2010), American neuroscientist
 Tamas Galambos (born 1939), Hungarian contemporary artist

References

Hungarian-language surnames